Kim-Lian van der Meij (born 1 October 1980 in Beverwijk) is a Dutch musical actress, presenter and a singer-songwriter.

Biography
Kim-Lian comes from a musical family. Both her parents were professional dancers. Kim-Lian won a number of dance contests in her childhood and regularly competed in lip-sync shows. She competed in the Dutch tv-program "De Mini Playbackshow" (think of Stars in their Eyes Kids) twice, once at the age of 6 and once when she was 11.

When she turned 16 she was signed at several castings and model agencies. She was soon asked to play minor roles in Dutch TV programs such as Goede Tijden Slechte Tijden, Kees & Co and more. After screentesting for the Veronica TV channel she was a hostess of CallTV. From 2001 to 2002 she hosted Puzzeltijd (Puzzletime).

After she quit Puzzeltijd Kim-Lian retreated from publicity. But in 2003 she was asked to host the Kids Top 20 for the children network Jetix. This TV program had audiences of 200,000 children every week. For this program she won the highest award in the Netherlands for a children program: the Gouden Stuiver (The Golden Nickel).

She ended up hosting the award-show in 2013.

Music career

2003–2005: Balance
In 2003 she got the chance by CMM Records to record an album. At the end of 2003 the first single "Teenage Superstar" was released. Already Kim-Lian went international. Teenage Superstar became a No. 1 hit in Indonesia and was charted in the Netherlands, Belgium, South Africa, Asia, Sweden and Italy.

After "Hey Boy!" was released (which also did well in all the charts), Kim-Lian's debut album Balance was released, which peaked at No. 9 in the Dutch Album Chart.

The third single "Garden of Love" was released to show a more mature side of Kim. It was a song with some heavy guitars in it. Although she was promoted as a children artist, this song had serious lyrics. "Garden of Love" made it into the Top 40 in the Netherlands.

The last single that was released off the album was a cover of Kim Wilde's song "Kids in America". The song became another top 10 hit for Kim in the Netherlands.

At the end of 2004 Kim-Lian released a DVD called Balance: The Experience. The DVD contains the music videos and live performances.

Because she has such an extraordinary look and acts funny, she was asked to join the presenters cast of Top of the Pops from BBC. And in that same time a more dynamic version of "Teenage Superstar" was released in the UK.

2006: Just Do It
After splitting up with her record label CMM Records, because Kim-Lian refused to sing more children music, she worked on her second album. She wanted to produce it herself and was helped by the Swedish producer (and partner) Daniël Gibson. They built a studio at their home and started to write songs. Writing music was for Kim-Lian something she loved. They wrote with several writers from different countries, such as Sweden, England, the Netherlands and Belgium.

The first single of Just Do It was "Road to Heaven". And she showed that she did not need to make children music to have hits. It wasn't a massive hit, it peaked at No. 28 in the Top 40, but it was a start.

On 12 October, she released "In Vain", the second single off the upcoming second album Just Do It. It is an emotional song where in the video she dies. After spending 6 weeks in the Tipparade (Dutch pre-chart) it was expected to chart in the Dutch Top 40 next week. But it did not enter.

Kim-lian had got plans to go abroad with her second and last album to date but it was never confirmed. She went on to record one-off singles, and film-soundtracks.

Musicals
In 1994 Kim-lian played in the musical Kruistocht in Spijkerbroek(Crusade in Jeans), based on the children-novel of Thea Beckman. During the first season of the Kids Top 20, Kim-Lian played a role in the musical Home. At the end of 2003 she played in the musical Kunt u mij de weg naar Hamelen vertellen, mijnheer? (Can you tell me the road to Hamelen, sir?). In 2005 Kim-Lian played the role of De Kleine Zeemeermin (Little Mermaid) along with Belgian singer Kathleen Aerts. In 2007 she starred in the musical Doe Maar which was based on the experiences of the Dutch band by the same name). This was followed by appearances in adaptations of Fame, Footloose, Legally Blonde and Shrek.

Cartoons
Kim-Lian provided the Dutch voice of Smurfette in The Smurfs and The Smurfs 2; she also did Rapunzel in the movie of the same name.

Personal life
Kim-Lian is married to Swedish producer Daniel Gibson who wrote Teenage Superstar. They have a daughter and two sons.

Discography

Albums

Singles

Filmography

Apart from doing musicals she also acts in some TV-programs.

Television
These are the TV-programs she hosted.

Awards and nominations

References

External links

 

1980 births
Living people
Dutch television actresses
People from Beverwijk
Dutch television presenters
21st-century Dutch singers
21st-century Dutch women singers
Dutch women television presenters